Barrass is a surname. Notable people with the surname include:

Alexander Barrass, 19th-century English poet and songwriter
Malcolm Barrass, English football player born in 1924, son of Matt Barrass (born 1899) and grandfather of Matt Barrass (born 1980)
Matt Barrass (footballer, born 1980), English football player born in 1980 and great-grandson of Matt Barrass (born 1899)
Matt Barrass (footballer, born 1899), English football player born in 1899
Natalie Barrass, presenter on the former BBC children's radio programme The Big Toe Radio Show
Tom Barrass, Australian rules footballer

See also
Henry Barrass Stadium, a small stadium in Jubilee Park, Edmonton, Enfield, London
Barras (disambiguation)
Baras (disambiguation)